Wow and Flutter is an EP by the post-rock band Stereolab, which served as the second single from their 1994 album Mars Audiac Quintet. A limited edition of 3,000 7" copies was released with hand-painted covers. The EP was also released on CD and 10" vinyl.

Two of the tracks are alternative versions of songs on Mars Audiac Quintet. "Wow and Flutter" itself is a re-recording, while "Nihilist Assault Group, Pts. 3-5" comprises sections excised from the album version, which was originally planned to be a side-long suite similar in concept to the 18-minute "Jenny Ondioline" on Transient Random-Noise Bursts with Announcements.

Track listing
 "Wow and Flutter" – 3:07
 "Heavy Denim" – 2:49
 "Nihilist Assault Group, Pts. 3–5" – 7:12
 "Narco Martenot" – 4:23

All tracks appear on the Oscillons from the Anti-Sun 2005 compilation album.

References

Sources

1994 EPs
Stereolab EPs